Leo Brent Bozell (October 13, 1886 – March 24, 1946) was an American advertising executive who co-founded the advertising agency now known as Bozell.

Life and career

Bozell was born in Mitchell County, Kansas, the son of Clarinda J. (Wallis) and Oscar Bozell. He graduated from the University of Kansas in 1910, then worked in the news department of the Wichita Eagle. He co-founded Bozell & Jacobs with Morris E. Jacobs in 1921.

Headquartered in Omaha, the advertising agency he founded also had offices in Indianapolis, Shreveport, Houston and Dallas at the time of his death. The firm specialized in services to public utilities.

Bozell was a veteran of World War I and later a lieutenant colonel in the Nebraska State Guard, which was activated during World War II.

He served as president of the Omaha Chamber of Commerce and commander of the Omaha branch of the American Legion. He held a leadership role in his local Episcopal Church. He served as a director of the Omaha & Council Bluffs Street Railway Company, and testified before the United States House of Representatives on their behalf.

He died of a heart ailment at his home in Omaha on March 24, 1946 at the age of 59.

Family
 
His son L. Brent Bozell Jr. was an American conservative activist and Catholic writer. His daughter-in-law was author Patricia Buckley Bozell. His grandson is author and activist L. Brent Bozell III.

References

External links
Bozell corporate history

1886 births
1946 deaths
American advertising executives
People from Rice County, Kansas
University of Kansas alumni
Businesspeople from Kansas
20th-century American businesspeople